Daniel Alexander Murray (1862–1934) was a Canadian mathematician.

Murray was born in Colchester County, Nova Scotia, and was educated at Dalhousie University and Johns Hopkins University, as well as universities in Berlin and Paris.  He was successively associate professor of mathematics at New York University, instructor at Cornell University, professor at Dalhousie University, and, after 1907, professor of applied mathematics at McGill University.

Publications
 Introductory Course in Differential Equations (1897)
 An Elementary Course in the Integral Calculus (1898)
 Plane and Spherical Trigonometry (1902)
 Essentials of Trigonometry and Mensuration (1909)
 Elements of Plane Trigonometry (1911)

External links
 

Canadian expatriate academics in the United States
Canadian mathematicians
Canadian people of Scottish descent
Cornell University faculty
Academic staff of the Dalhousie University
Academic staff of McGill University
New York University faculty
People from Colchester County
1862 births
1934 deaths
Johns Hopkins University alumni
Canadian expatriates in France
Canadian expatriates in Germany